Southern Iraqi football clubs Al-Minaa and Naft Al-Basra (formerly Naft Al-Janoob until 2020) have been rivals since the 2004–05 season when Naft Al-Basra club started playing in the Premier League. The clubs are respectively from Al-Maqal and Al-Tamimia, in the same city Basra, and for this reason a match between the two teams is sometimes called a "Basra derby". Another name is often used in the press is "South derby", which comes from the location of Basra province in southern Iraq. The animosity intensified since the first match, as Naft Al-Basra was not expected to win Al-Minaa 1–0, and the exaggerated protest by Al-Minaa supporters to referee of match Khalil Yousuf prompted him to retire arbitration forever. and this animosity reached a peak during the 2010–11 season, when both teams played at the end of the season in the Premier League in a match, that if it end at a draw, Naft Al-Basra will relegate to the Iraq Division One. Indeed, the match ended in a draw, and Al-Minaa fans celebrated the relegation of Naft Al-Basra, and considered it a winning of league title. In the 2015–16 season, Naft Al-Basra returned to avenge Al-Minaa, when both teams played at the end of the season in the Premier League. Al-Minaa needed two goals to go to the final, but Naft Al-Basra played a defensive squad until the end of the match, although they were losing 1–0.

The results of some of these match led to the dismissal of some coaches. In the 2007–08 season, the Naft Al-Basra management dismissed the coach Abdul Razzaq Ahmed after the match ended against Al-Minaa 3–3, and in the 2012–13 season, the Al-Minaa administration dismissed the coach Aqeel Hato after the match ended for Naft Al-Basra 4–3.

Since 2005, there have been 31 competitive Basra Derbies. Al-Minaa hold the precedence in these matches, with 10 victories to Naft Al-Basra's 9; there have been 12 draws. The most decisive result in an Al-Minaa–Naft Al-Basra game is Al-Minaa's 4–1 victory at Al Mina'a Stadium, their home ground, on March 11, 2005. There have been two incidences of 3–1, Al-Minaa have been won in both matches; home in December 2005, and away in January 2006.

History

Origins

Al-Minaa began to play in the league since its inception in Iraq, in the 1975–74 season. It is one of the oldest clubs (established in 1931), and one of the most popular teams. Naft Al-Basra is a new club (established in 1979). It played its first league match in the 2004–05 season. The first match between the two clubs was dated as 24 January 2005, as Naft Al-Basra hosted Al-Minaa in Premier League. Naft Al-Basra beat Al-Minaa 1–0 in the inaugural match. The second match at Al-Minaa Stadium came on 11 March of the same year – Al-Minaa won 4–1. Four more matches were played over the next two seasons, all Al-Minaa victories. Then, two matches between the two clubs took place during the 2007–08 season; all ended with a draw. Naft Al-Basra took precedence over the following seasons, with plenty of draw results.

Thaghr Al Iraq Championship
Top Basra teams Al-Minaa and Naft Al-Basra met at the conclusion of the First Thaghr Al Iraq Championship organized by Basra Football Association from December 14, 2009 till December 21. Referees Ahmad Shaker, Lafta Hameed, Hazem Mohammed and Rashid Hussein lead the match. Al-Minaa advanced to the final after collecting 7 points by winning against Naft Maysan 3–1, Ghaz Al-Junoob 4–1. To that, Naft Al-Basra qualified after collecting the same number of points as it beat Al-Nassriya 3–0 and Al-Bahri 2–1. Al-Minaa won Thaghr Al Iraq Championship after winning over Naft Al-Basra at the final with a score of 2–1. Al Minaa’ goals were scored by Nayef Falah at the 46th minute and Hassan Hadi Ahmad at the 79th minute. On the other hand, the sole goal of Naft Al-Basra was scored by Muhannad Yousuf at the 10th minute of the game. The two teams shared the lead of the game that was led by referee Ahmad Shaker. The referee gave red cards to 3 players: Amjad Hameed, Alaa Nayrouz from Naft Al-Basra team and Al-Minaa player Ihsan Hadi.

Statistics
Up to and including 14 February 2022, there have been 31 competitive first–class meetings between the two teams since the first meeting in 2005.

Head-to-head record by competition

Honours and achievements compared

All-time results 

Competitive matches only.

Al-Minaa at home 
Al-Minaa result given first.

Naft Al-Basra at home 
Naft Al-Basra result given first.

Goalscorers

The competition saw 59 goals scored, 31 for Al-Minaa and 28 for Naft Al-Basra; the individual player who scored the most goals was Al-Minaa player Ihsan Hadi and Naft Al-Basra player Bassim Ali, each scored four goals. And there are five players who scored for both teams, they are Alaa Aasi, Nasser Talla Dahilan, Ahmed Hassan, Sajjad Abdul Kadhim and Hussam Malik.

Al-Minaa

Naft Al-Basra

See also
 Al-Mina'a SC
 Naft Al-Basra SC

References 

Naft Al-Basra
Sport in Basra
Football in Iraq
Iraqi football derbies